Saponaria is a genus of flowering plants in the family Caryophyllaceae, native to Asia and Europe, and are commonly known as soapworts. They are herbaceous perennials and annuals, some with woody bases. The flowers are abundant, five-petalled and usually in shades of pink or white. The genus is closely related to Lychnis and Silene, being distinguished from these by having only two (not three or five) styles in the flower. It is also related to Gypsophila, but its calyx is cylindrical rather than bell-shaped.

The most familiar species might be common soapwort (S. officinalis), which is native to Eurasia but is known in much of the world as an introduced species, often a weed, and sometimes a cultivated ornamental plant. The genus name Saponaria derives from the Latin sapo ("soap") and -aria ("pertaining to"), and at least one species, S. officinalis, has been used to make soap. It contains saponins, and a liquid soap could be produced by soaking the leaves in water. This soap is still used to clean delicate antique tapestries.

Saponaria species are eaten by the larvae of some butterflies and moths, including the Lychnis and Coleophora saponariella, which is exclusive to the genus.

Diversity
There are thirty to forty species in the genus.

Species include:

Saponaria bargyliana
Saponaria bellidifolia
Saponaria caespitosa
Saponaria calabrica – Adriatic soapwort
Saponaria jagelii
Saponaria karapinarensis
Saponaria kotschyi
Saponaria lutea
Saponaria ocymoides – rock soapwort, tumbling-Ted
Saponaria officinalis – bouncingbet, sweet Betty
Saponaria pamphylica
Saponaria pumila
Saponaria pumilio – pygmy pink
Saponaria sicula
Saponaria suffruticosa

References

External links
 Saponaria. ITIS.

Caryophyllaceae
Caryophyllaceae genera
Saponaceous plants
Taxa named by Carl Linnaeus